Storm in a Water Glass may refer to:
 Storm in a Water Glass (1931 film), an Austrian-German comedy film
 Storm in a Water Glass (1960 film), a West German comedy film